Dorking Cricket Club Ground is a cricket ground in Dorking, Surrey.  The first recorded match on the ground was in 1993, when the ground hosted a single Women's One Day International in the 1993 Women's Cricket World Cup between Ireland women and West Indies women.

In local domestic cricket, the ground is the home venue of Dorking Cricket Club.

References

External links
Dorking Cricket Club Ground on CricketArchive
Dorking Cricket Club Ground on Cricinfo

Cricket grounds in Surrey
Sports venues completed in 1993